Rose Mary Glaser (October 21, 1921 – May 11, 2012) played for the Kenosha Comets of the All-American Girls Professional Baseball League in 1944. A utility player, she appeared in 10 games for the club. She was right-handed. Her nickname was Hap.

References

1921 births
2012 deaths
All-American Girls Professional Baseball League players
Kenosha Comets players
Indiana Wesleyan University alumni
University of Cincinnati alumni
Cincinnati Bearcats women's basketball players
Xavier University alumni